Michael Lark (born 1966) is an American comics artist and colorist.

Lark has provided pencils for DC Comics' Batman, Terminal City, Gotham Central and Legend of the Hawkman. His work for Marvel Comics includes The Pulse and Captain America. He created Lazarus with Greg Rucka, contributing to every issue.

References

American comics artists
1966 births
Living people